The Nikon Coolpix P600 is a DSLR-like ultrazoom bridge camera announced by Nikon on February 7, 2014.

At its announcement date, it was briefly the bridge or compact camera with the largest maximum equivalent focal length, at 1440 mm, but was succeeded in this position only a few days later with the announcement of the Sony Cyber-shot DSC-H400 with 1550 mm maximum equivalent focal length.

The camera can also be connected to the Internet, the first of its kind.

References
 

P600
Superzoom cameras
Cameras introduced in 2014